Berthierite is a mineral, a sulfide of iron and antimony with formula FeSb2S4. It is steel grey in colour with a metallic lustre which can be covered by an iridescent tarnish.  Because of its appearance it is often mistaken for stibnite.

It was discovered in France in 1827 and named for the French chemist, Pierre Berthier (1782–1861).

See also
List of minerals
List of minerals named after people

References

Mineral galleries
Mindat
Webmineral

Iron(II) minerals
Antimony minerals
Sulfosalt minerals
Orthorhombic minerals
Minerals in space group 62